Ludwig David Morenz (born 4 April 1965) is German professor in Egyptology at the University of Bonn. He received his Ph.D. from the University of Leipzig and Habilitation from the University of Tübingen. His fields of research include the origins of Egyptian writing, Ancient Egyptian literature, ancient Egyptian society, and Renaissance and Baroque-era European studies on ancient Egypt.
His current focus of research is exploring various levels of economic dependencies of Cannanites in relation to Egypt, that is not limited to slaves or illiterate workforce.

Education
In 1985 he got a Diploma in Oriental Archeology at the Martin-Luther-Universität Halle-Wittenberg. In 1990 he received his Ph.D. at the University of Leipzig in Egyptology and Coptology.

Career
In 2002 he received a Heisenberg scholarship of the DFG (German Research Foundation). In 2005 he got Herzog Ernst Fellowship at the Gotha Research Library, where he worked on Case Study on the Egyptian Reception.
In 2006 he was a guest Scientist at Uppsala Universitet. In 2006 - 2007 he was a Senior Fellow at the International Research Center for Cultural Studies in Vienna.
In 2009 he got a position as a professor of Egyptology at the University of Bonn.

International Conferences
 "The Alpha and the Omega of Sinuhe. Reinterpretating a Classical Middle Egyptian Text", with H. Hays and F. Feder at Universiteit Leiden, 2009.
  Member of the International Organizing Committee of the Xth International Congress of Egyptians in Rhodes, 2008.
 "Preface or formative phase. Egypt and the Near East 3500 - 2700 BC" at Universität Leipzig, 2007.
 "Text and Image. Trans- and intermediality from Egyptological, Ancient Near Eastern and Old Testament perspectives", with S. Schorch, Bethel / Bielefeld, 2007.
 "What is a text? Egyptological, Ancient Near Eastern and Old Testament Perspectives", with S. Schorch, Bethel / Bielefeld, 2005.
 "Exotic, Wisdom and Ancient. European Constructions of Ancient Egypt", with T. Glück at Universität Leipzig, 2004.

Books
 "The Time of the Regions in the Mirror of the Gebelein Region: Cultural-Historical Re-Constructions (Problems of A) (Problems of Egyptology)", 2010.
 "Meaning and Mystery of the Signs: Visual Poetry in Ancient Egypt", 2008.
 "Menschen und Götter. Buchstaben und Bilder"

See also
List of Egyptologists

Notes

References
Tait, John W. (2003). 'Never Had the Like Occurred': Egypt's View of Its Past. Edited by John W. Tait. London: University College London, Institute of Archaeology, an imprint of Cavendish Publishing Limited. .

German Egyptologists
Academic staff of Leipzig University
Living people
1965 births
German male non-fiction writers
Archaeologists from North Rhine-Westphalia